Cressmont may refer to:

 Cressmont, Kentucky
 Cressmont, West Virginia